Sergio López Galache (born 8 April 1999) is a German professional footballer who plays as a right-back for Basel in the Swiss Super League.

Early life
López was born in Remscheid, Germany to German-born parents of Spanish descent; all four of his grandparents are Spanish. He holds both German and Spanish passports, and moved to Spain at the age of 4. In 2007, he began playing football with the academy of Salamanca before moving to Santa Marta. In 2016 he again moved, joining the youth academy of Real Madrid.

Career
López began his senior career with the Real Madrid B side in the Tercera División. He joined Valladolid Promesas for the 2020–21 season. He made an appearance with the senior Real Valladolid side, in a 5–0 Copa del Rey win over CD Cantolagua on 15 December 2020.

On 23 June 2021, he signed a professional contract with Basel, keeping him at the club until summer 2024. He made his professional debut with Basel in a 3–0 UEFA Europa Conference League win over Partizani Tirana on 22 July 2021.

References

External links
 
 
 
 Real Madrid Profile
 SFL Profile

1999 births
Living people
People from Remscheid
Sportspeople from Düsseldorf (region)
German footballers
Spanish footballers
German people of Spanish descent
Association football fullbacks
Real Madrid Castilla footballers
Real Valladolid Promesas players
Real Valladolid players
FC Basel players
Tercera División players
Swiss Super League players
German expatriate footballers
Spanish expatriate footballers
German expatriate sportspeople in Switzerland
Spanish expatriate sportspeople in Switzerland
Expatriate footballers in Switzerland
Footballers from North Rhine-Westphalia